Football at the 1998 Asian Games was held in Thailand from 30 November to 19 December 1998. 24 countries participated in the football competition.

Iran won the men's gold medal with the skeleton of the team that played in the 1998 FIFA World Cup in France with addition of some new players. Iran won the goal medal defeating Kuwait in the final 2–0. China beat the host team Thailand 3–0 in the bronze medal match to finish third.

China won the women's competition after beating North Korea 1–0 after the extra time.

Schedule

Medalists

Medal table

Draw

Men

Group A
 
 
 

Group B
 
 
 

Group C
 
 
 

Group D
 
 
 
 *

Group E
 
 *
 
 *

Group F
 
 
 

Group G
 
 
 

Group H
 
 
 

* Withdrew

Women

Group A
 
 
 
 

Group B

Squads

Final standing

Men

Women

References
 RSSSF

External links
Results
Asian Football Results 1998

 
1998 Asian Games events
1998
Asian Games
Asian Games
1998 Asian Games